The , also known as the  or , was an uprising that occurred in the Shimabara Domain of the Tokugawa Shogunate in Japan from 17 December 1637 to 15 April 1638.

Matsukura Katsuie, the daimyō of the Shimabara Domain, enforced unpopular policies set by his father Matsukura Shigemasa that drastically raised taxes to construct the new Shimabara Castle and violently prohibited Christianity. In December 1637, an alliance of local rōnin and mostly Catholic peasants led by Amakusa Shirō rebelled against the Tokugawa shogunate due to discontent over Katsuie's policies. The Tokugawa Shogunate sent a force of over 125,000 troops supported by the Dutch to suppress the rebels and defeated them after a lengthy siege against their stronghold at Hara Castle in Minamishimabara.

Following the successful suppression of the rebellion, Shirō and an estimated 37,000 rebels and sympathizers were executed by beheading, and the Portuguese traders suspected of helping them were expelled from Japan. Katsuie was investigated for misruling, and was eventually beheaded in Edo, becoming the only daimyō to be executed during the Edo period. The Shimabara Domain was given to Kōriki Tadafusa. Japan's policies of national seclusion and persecution of Christianity were tightened until the Bakumatsu in the 1850s. 

Shimabara Rebellion is often portrayed as a Christian rebellion against violent suppression by Matsukura Katsuie. However the main academic understanding is that the rebellion was mainly against Matsukura's misgovernance by peasants, with Christians later joining the rebellion. 

The Shimabara Rebellion was the largest civil conflict in Japan during the Edo period, and was one of only a handful of instances of serious unrest during the relatively peaceful period of the Tokugawa shogunate's rule.

Leadup and outbreak
In the mid-1630s, the peasants of the Shimabara Peninsula and Amakusa, dissatisfied with overtaxation and suffering from the effects of famine, revolted against their lords. This was specifically in territory ruled by two lords: Matsukura Katsuie of the Shimabara Domain, and Terasawa Katataka of the Karatsu Domain. Those affected also included fishermen, craftsmen and merchants. As the rebellion spread, it was joined by rōnin (masterless samurai) who once had served families, such as the Amakusa and Shiki, who had once lived in the area, as well as former Arima clan and Konishi retainers. As such, the image of a fully "peasant" uprising is also not entirely accurate.

Shimabara was once the domain of the Arima clan, which had been Christian; as a result, many locals were also Christian. The Arima were moved out in 1614 and replaced by the Matsukura. The new lord, Matsukura Shigemasa, hoped to advance in the shogunate hierarchy, and so he was involved with various construction projects, including the building and expansion of Edo Castle, as well as a planned invasion of Luzon in the Spanish East Indies (today a part of the Philippines). He also built a new castle at Shimabara. As a result, he placed a greatly disproportionate tax burden on the people of his new domain and further angered them by strictly persecuting Christianity. The policies were continued by Shigemasa's heir, Katsuie.

The inhabitants of the Amakusa Islands, which had been part of the fief of Konishi Yukinaga, suffered the same sort of persecution at the hands the Terasawa family, which, like the Matsukura, had been moved there.

Rebellion

Start

The discontented rōnin of the region, as well as the peasants, began to meet in secret on Yushima (also called "meeting island") and plot an uprising, which broke out on 17 December 1637, when the local daikan (magistrate) Hayashi Hyōzaemon was assassinated. At the same time, others rebelled in the Amakusa Islands. The rebels quickly increased their ranks by forcing all in the areas they took to join in the uprising. A charismatic 16-year-old youth, Amakusa Shirō, soon emerged as the rebellion's leader.

The rebels laid siege to the Terasawa clan's Tomioka and Hondo castles, but just before the castles were about to fall, armies from the neighboring domains in Kyūshū arrived, forcing them to retreat. The rebels then crossed the Ariake Sea and briefly besieged Matsukura Katsuie's Shimabara Castle, but were again repelled. At this point they gathered on the site of Hara Castle, which had been the original castle of the Arima clan before their move to the Nobeoka Domain, but had since been dismantled. They built up palisades using the wood from the boats they had crossed the water with, and were greatly aided in their preparations by the weapons, ammunition, and provisions they had plundered from the Matsukura clan's storehouses.

Siege at Hara Castle

The allied armies of the local domains, under the command of the Tokugawa shogunate (during shogun Tokugawa Iemitsu's reign) with Itakura Shigemasa as commander-in-chief, then began their siege of Hara Castle. The swordsman Miyamoto Musashi was present in the besieging army, in an advisory role to Hosokawa Tadatoshi. The event where Musashi was knocked off his horse by a stone thrown by one of the peasants is one of the only few verifiable records of him taking part in a campaign.

The shogunate troops then requested aid from the Dutch, who first gave them gunpowder ;, and then cannons. Nicolaes Couckebacker, Opperhoofd of the Dutch factory on Hirado, provided the gunpowder and cannons, and when the shogunate forces requested that he send a vessel, he personally accompanied the vessel de Ryp to a position offshore, near Hara Castle. The cannons sent previously were mounted in a battery, and an all-out bombardment of the fortress commenced, both from the shore guns as well as from the 20 guns of the de Ryp. These guns fired approximately 426 rounds in the space of 15 days (at least once per hour on average), without great result, and two Dutch lookouts were shot by the rebels. The ship withdrew at the request of the Japanese, following contemptuous messages sent by the rebels to the besieging troops:

Are there no longer courageous soldiers in the realm to do combat with us, and weren't they ashamed to have called in the assistance of foreigners against our small contingent?

Final push and fall
In an attempt to take the castle, Itakura Shigemasa was killed. More shogunate troops under Matsudaira Nobutsuna, Itakura's replacement, soon arrived. However, the rebels at Hara Castle resisted the siege for months and caused the shogunate heavy losses. Both sides had a hard time fighting in winter conditions.  On February 3, 1638, a rebel raid killed 2,000 warriors from the Hizen Domain. However, despite this minor victory, the rebels slowly ran out of food, ammunition and other provisions.

On 4 April 1638, over 27,000 rebels, facing about 125,000 shogunate soldiers, mounted a desperate assault, but were soon forced to withdraw. Captured survivors and the fortress' rumored sole traitor, Yamada Emosaku, revealed the fortress was out of food and gunpowder.

On 12 April 1638, troops under the command of the Kuroda clan of Hizen stormed the fortress and captured the outer defenses. The rebels continued to hold out and caused heavy casualties until they were routed three days later, on 15 April 1638.

Forces present at Shimabara
The Shimabara rebellion was the first massive military effort since the Siege of Osaka where the shogunate had to supervise an allied army made up of troops from various domains. The first overall commander, Itakura Shigemasa, had 800 men under his direct command; his replacement, Matsudaira Nobutsuna, had 1,500. Vice-commander Toda Ujikane had 2,500 of his own troops and 2,500 samurai of the Shimabara Domain were also present. The bulk of the shogunate's army was drawn from Shimabara's neighboring domains. The largest component, numbering over 35,000 men, came from the Saga Domain, and was under the command of Nabeshima Katsushige. Second in numbers were the forces of the Kumamoto and Fukuoka domains; 23,500 men under Hosokawa Tadatoshi and 18,000 men under Kuroda Tadayuki, respectively. From the Kurume Domain came 8,300 men under Arima Toyouji; from the Yanagawa Domain 5,500 men under Tachibana Muneshige; from the Karatsu Domain, 7,570 under Terasawa Katataka; from Nobeoka, 3,300 under Arima Naozumi; from Kokura, 6,000 under Ogasawara Tadazane and his senior retainer Takada Matabei; from Nakatsu, 2,500 under Ogasawara Nagatsugu; from Bungo-Takada, 1,500 under Matsudaira Shigenao, and from Kagoshima, 1,000 under Yamada Arinaga, a senior retainer of the Shimazu clan. The only non-Kyushu forces, apart from the commanders' personal troops, were 5,600 men from the Fukuyama Domain, under the command of Mizuno Katsunari, Katsutoshi, and Katsusada. A small number of troops from various other locations amounted to 800 additional men. In total, the shogunate's army is known to have comprised over 125,800 men. The strength of the rebel forces is not precisely known, but combatants are estimated to have numbered over 14,000, while noncombatants who sheltered in the castle during the siege were over 13,000. One source estimates the total size of the rebel force as somewhere between 27,000 and 37,000, at best a quarter fraction of the size of the force sent by the shogunate.

Aftermath

After the castle fell, the shogunate forces beheaded an estimated 37,000 rebels and sympathizers.  Amakusa Shirō's severed head was taken to Nagasaki for public display, and the entire complex at Hara Castle was burned to the ground and buried together with the bodies of all the dead.

Because the shogunate suspected that European Catholics had been involved in spreading the rebellion, Portuguese traders were driven out of the country. The policy of national seclusion was made more strict by 1639. An existing ban on the Christian religion was then enforced stringently, and Christianity in Japan survived only by going underground.

Another part of the shogunate's actions after the rebellion was to excuse the clans which had aided its efforts militarily from the building contributions which it routinely required from various domains. However, Matsukura Katsuie's domain was given to another lord, Kōriki Tadafusa, and Matsukura began to be pressured by the shogunate to commit honourable ritual suicide, called seppuku. However, after the body of a peasant was found in his residence, proving his misrule and brutality, Matsukura was beheaded in Edo. The Terazawa clan survived, but died out almost 10 years later, due to Katataka's lack of a successor.

On the Shimabara peninsula, most towns experienced a severe to total loss of population as a result of the rebellion. In order to maintain the rice fields and other crops, immigrants were brought from other areas across Japan to resettle the land. All inhabitants were registered with local temples, whose priests were required to vouch for their members' religious affiliation. Following the rebellion, Buddhism was strongly promoted in the area. Certain customs were introduced which remain unique to the area today. Towns on the Shimabara peninsula also continue to have a varied mix of dialects due to the mass immigration from other parts of Japan.

With the exception of periodic, localized peasant uprisings, the Shimabara Rebellion was the last large-scale armed clash in Japan until the 1860s.

Notes

See also
 Dejima
 Haibutsu kishaku
 Kakure Kirishitan
 History of the Catholic Church in Japan

References

English
 Bellah, Robert N. (1957). Tokugawa Religion. (New York: The Free Press).
 Bolitho, Harold. (1974). Treasures Among Men: The Fudai Daimyo in Tokugawa Japan. New Haven: Yale University Press.  ; OCLC 185685588
 Borton, Hugh (1955). Japan's Modern Century. (New York: The Ronald Press Company).
 DeBary, William T., et al. (2001). Sources of Japanese Tradition: From Earliest Times to 1600. New York: Columbia University Press.
 Doeff, Hendrik (2003). Recollections of Japan. Translated and Annotated by Annick M. Doeff. (Victoria, B.C.: Trafford).
 Harbottle, Thomas Benfield (1904). Dictionary of Battles from the Earliest Date to the Present Time. (London: Swan Sonnenschein & Co. Ltd.)
 Harris, Victor (1974). Introduction to A Book of Five Rings. (New York: The Overlook Press).
 Mason, R.H.P. (1997). A History of Japan. North Clarendon: Tuttle Publishing.
 Morton, William S. (2005). Japan: Its History and Culture. (New York: McGraw-Hill Professional).
 Murray, David (1905). Japan. (New York: G.P. Putnam's Sons).
 Perrin, Noel (1979). Giving Up the Gun: Japan's Reversion to the Sword, 1543–1879. (Boston: David R. Godine, Publisher)

Japanese

 Naramoto Tatsuya (1994). Nihon no kassen: monoshiri jiten. (Tokyo: Shufu to Seikatsusha).
 Naramoto Tatsuya (2001). Nihon meijōshū. (Tokyo: Gakken).

Further reading
 Clements, Jonathan (2016). Christ's Samurai: The True Story of the Shimabara Rebellion. (London: Robinson).
 Morris, Ivan (1975). The nobility of failure: tragic heroes in the history of Japan. (New York: Holt, Rinehart and Winston).
 Sukeno Kentarō (1967). Shimabara no Ran. (Tokyo: Azuma Shuppan).
 Toda Toshio (1988). Amakusa, Shimabara no ran: Hosokawa-han shiryō ni yoru. (Tokyo: Shin Jinbutsu  Ōraisha).

External links
 The Christian Century in Japan, by Charles Boxer
 Duarte Correa Manuscripts

Conflicts in 1637
Conflicts in 1638
1637 in Christianity
1638 in Christianity
17th-century rebellions
Rebellions in Japan
History of Christianity in Japan
1638 in Japan
1637 in Japan
Battles involving Japan
Sieges involving Japan
Last stands
Catholic rebellions
Ikki
17th-century military history of Japan